Harold Mahony defeated Wilberforce Eaves 6–2, 6–2, 11–9 in the All Comers Final, and then defeated the reigning champion Wilfred Baddeley 6–2, 6–8, 5–7, 8–6, 6–3 in the challenge round to win the gentlemen's singles tennis title at the 1896 Wimbledon Championships.

Draw

Challenge round

All comers' finals

Top half

Bottom half

References

External links

Gentlemen's Singles
Wimbledon Championship by year – Men's singles